was one of 18   escort destroyers built for the Imperial Japanese Navy during World War II.

Completed on 6 June 1944, Take was assigned to Desron 11 of the Combined Fleet for a month's training, then was assigned to convoy escort duties.

On 3 December, Take was in Ormoc Bay, escorting convoy TA-7 while it landed reinforcements from Manila.

Immediately postwar, Take'' was used as a repatriation ship.  In 1947, she was turned over to Great Britain and then scrapped.

Bibliography

External links

Matsu-class destroyers
Ships built by Yokosuka Naval Arsenal
World War II destroyers of Japan
1944 ships